Ramiro Bravo (born 29 May 1962) is a Spanish fencer. He competed in the individual and team foil events at the 1992 Summer Olympics.

References

External links
 

1962 births
Living people
Spanish male foil fencers
Olympic fencers of Spain
Fencers at the 1992 Summer Olympics
Sportspeople from A Coruña